Beautiful You is a novel by Chuck Palahniuk, released October 21, 2014. It is set in New York City and follows the main character, Penny, who finds herself the object of affection of a Digital Age tycoon named C. Linus Maxwell, known to the Manhattan elite as "Cli-Max well".

References

2014 American novels
Novels by Chuck Palahniuk
Novels set in New York City
Doubleday (publisher) books